The 1928 Waratahs tour of New Zealand was a collection of rugby union games undertaken by the New South Wales Teams against invitational and national teams of New Zealand.

The Queensland Rugby Union had collapsed in 1919 and would not be reborn until 1929 leaving the New South Wales Rugby Union to administer the game in Australia at the national representative level. In 1928 the New South Wales side toured New Zealand three years after the previous tour  over the Tasman Sea and only few mount after the tour of the British Isles, France and Canada.

Matches 
Scores and results list New South Wales' points tally first.

References
All found on link
 The Sydney Morning Herald, Monday 27 August 1928 p 8
 The Brisbane Courier, Saturday 1 September 1928 p 6 
 The Sydney Morning Herald, Monday 3 September 1928 p 9
 The Sydney Morning Herald, Thursday 6 September 1928 p 18
 The Brisbane Courier, Monday 10 September 1928 p 7 
 Cairns Post (Qld. : 1909 – 1954) Friday 14 September 1928 p 6
 The Sydney Morning Herald, Monday 17 September 1928 p 16
 The Sydney Morning Herald, Thursday 20 September 1928 p 14
 The Sydney Morning Herald, Monday 24 September 1928 p 8
 The Sydney Morning Herald, Thursday 27 September 1928 p 15

Australia
Waratahs
Australia national rugby union team tours of New Zealand
1928 in New Zealand rugby union